George Thomas Bailey (February 7, 1949 – September 2, 2005) was an American football running back in the National Football League. He was a 10th round selection (256th overall pick) in the 1971 NFL Draft out of Florida State University. He played four seasons for the Philadelphia Eagles (1971–1974). After his professional football career, Bailey earned an MBA from the University of South Florida and then began a successful executive career in multiple industries; the consumer products industry, the wholesale pharmaceutical industry, and his own successful IPO and corporation consulting firm. George (Tom) raised two children; Erin and Thomas with his wife Susan O'Shea Bailey in the Dallas, Texas area for the majority of his life. He died on September 2, 2005 in Jacksonville Beach, Florida due to a massive heart attack and complications from atherosclerosis. During his tenure at Florida State University, Tom Bailey held and still holds some of Florida State University's top athletic and running back statistics which include the first touchdown in the inaugural Peach Bowl. An endowment scholarship in his name was created by Florida State University athletic alumni in 2010, this scholarship being awarded to future Florida State University athletes.

1949 births
Players of American football from Gainesville, Florida
American football running backs
Philadelphia Eagles players
Florida State Seminoles football players
2005 deaths